Diallus guttatus is a species of beetle in the family Cerambycidae. It was described by Francis Polkinghorne Pascoe in 1885. It is known from Moluccas.

References

Lamiini
Beetles described in 1885
Taxa named by Francis Polkinghorne Pascoe